Majid Nizami (April 3, 1928 – July 26, 2014) was a Chairman of Majid Nizami Trust, chief editor and publisher of Nawa-i-Waqt Group of Publications of Pakistan. Nawa-i-Waqt newspaper was founded by Majid's older brother, Hameed Nizami (3 Oct 1915-22 Feb 1962) in 1940, who had later died in 1962 at age 46 in Pakistan and now it is owned by Majid Nizami Trust. Majid Nizami then stepped in to start managing the Nawa-i-Waqt newspaper in 1962. Majid Nizami was also the chairman of Nazaria-i-Pakistan Trust.

Early life and career
After doing his high school education in his local town Sangla Hill, Majid Nizami was educated at Islamia College, Lahore, where he obtained his master's degree in Political Science and then went on to London to study law in 1954. During his student days in British India, he actively participated in the Pakistan Movement working towards the independence of Pakistan in 1947. Majid Nizami was one of the few people who served as an editor of a newspaper group for 48 years, as well as a journalist for 59 years.

Awards and recognition
Majid Nizami had won 3 different awards from the Government of Pakistan for his services during his lifetime.
Nishan-e-Imtiaz (Order of Excellence) Award
Sitara-i-Imtiaz (Star of Excellence) Award
Sitara-e-Pakistan (Star of Pakistan) Award
 Living Legend of Journalism Award in 2010
 Lifetime Achievement Award by All Pakistan Newspapers Society in 2011

See also
 Majid Nizami Trust (Nawa-i-waqt Group)
 The Nation (Pakistani newspaper)
 Nawa-i-Waqt (Pakistani newspaper)
List of Pakistani journalists

References

External links
 The Nation Official Site
 Nawa-i-Waqt Official Site
 Majid Nizami passes away

1928 births
2014 deaths
Pakistani male journalists
Pakistani media personalities
Punjabi people
Recipients of Nishan-e-Imtiaz
Recipients of Sitara-i-Imtiaz